Utricularia praeterita is a small annual carnivorous plant that belongs to the genus Utricularia. It is endemic to India. U. praeterita grows as a terrestrial plant in wet soils over laterite and by stream banks. It was originally described by Peter Taylor in 1983.

See also 
 List of Utricularia species

References 

Carnivorous plants of Asia
Flora of India (region)
praeterita